Kamil Zieliński (born 3 March 1988) is a Polish professional racing cyclist, who last rode for UCI Continental team . He wore the yellow jersey of general classification leader for one stage in the 2015 Tour de Pologne.

Major results

2009
 10th Overall Dookoła Mazowsza
2010
 2nd Overall Carpathia Couriers Paths
 5th Puchar Ministra Obrony Narodowej
2013
 4th Overall Course de la Solidarité Olympique
 10th Memoriał Andrzeja Trochanowskiego
2014
 1st  Overall Course de la Solidarité Olympique
1st Stage 4
 2nd Memoriał Andrzeja Trochanowskiego
 2nd Visegrad 4 Bicycle Race – GP Hungary
 3rd Tour Bohemia
 6th Overall Okolo Jižních Čech
 10th Visegrad 4 Bicycle Race – GP Slovakia
2015
 2nd Overall Podlasie Tour
1st Stage 1
 3rd Korona Kocich Gór
 5th Overall Tour of Małopolska
 9th Overall Bałtyk–Karkonosze Tour
1st Stage 6
2016
 5th Korona Kocich Gór
 6th Puchar Ministra Obrony Narodowej
 7th Overall Course de la Solidarité Olympique
 9th Memorial Grundmanna I Wizowskiego
 10th Overall Bałtyk–Karkonosze Tour
 10th Memoriał Andrzeja Trochanowskiego
2017
 1st  Overall East Bohemia Tour
1st  Points classification
1st Stage 2
 Visegrad 4 Bicycle Race
1st GP Hungary
1st GP Polski
 1st Stage 5 Course de Solidarność et des Champions Olympiques
 2nd Overall Szlakiem Walk Majora Hubala
1st  Points classification
1st Stage 2 (ITT)
 8th Overall Tour of Małopolska
1st Stage 1
 9th Overall Bałtyk–Karkonosze Tour
2018
 1st Stage 1 Szlakiem Walk Majora Hubala
 4th Overall Course de Solidarność et des Champions Olympiques
2019
 1st Mountains classification Bałtyk–Karkonosze Tour

References

External links

1988 births
Living people
Polish male cyclists
People from Ostrowiec Świętokrzyski
Sportspeople from Świętokrzyskie Voivodeship